Blanc comme neige is a 1948 French comedy film starring Bourvil.

It was a hit, with admissions in France of 3,666,283.

It was shot at the Saint-Maurice Studios in Paris.

References

External links

1948 films
French comedy films
1948 comedy films
French black-and-white films
1940s French films
1940s French-language films